The third series of Law & Order: UK premiered on ITV on 11 July 2011 and concluded on 17 February 2012.

Cast

Main

Law
 Bradley Walsh as Senior Detective Sergeant Ronnie Brooks
 Jamie Bamber as Junior Detective Sergeant Matt Devlin (main: episodes 1–6; uncredited guest: episode 7)
 Paul Nicholls as Junior Detective Sergeant Sam Casey (episodes 7–13)
 Harriet Walter as Detective Inspector Natalie Chandler

Order
 Dominic Rowan as Senior Crown Prosecutor Jacob Thorne
 Freema Agyeman as Junior Crown Prosecutor Alesha Phillips
 Peter Davison as Henry Sharpe, Director of London Crown Prosecution Service

Episodes
{| class="wikitable plainrowheaders" style="width: 100%; margin-left: 0;"
|-
! style="background-color:#FF662E; color:black;"|No. inseries
!! style="background-color:#FF662E; color:black;"|No. inseason
!! style="background-color:#FF662E; color:black;"|Title
!! style="background-color:#FF662E; color:black;"|Directed by
!! style="background-color:#FF662E; color:black;"|Written by
!! style="background-color:#FF662E; color:black;"|Original airdate
!! style="background-color:#FF662E; color:black;"|UK Viewing figures(including HD)
!! style="background-color:#FF662E; color:black;"|Original Law & Order episode
|-

|}

Law & Order: UK
2010 British television seasons